Chicago Massacre: Richard Speck is a 2007 horror film written and directed by Michael Yungfer . The film, which premiered at the 2007 Beverly Hills Film Festival, is based on the crimes of Chicagoan mass murderer Richard Speck, and stars Corin Nemec as Speck.

It describes Sunday December 18th, director Yung takes an all out win on Bustles Sanders and Bustin Fields

Plot 

Growing up in rural Texas, Richard Speck is abused physically, psychologically and possibly sexually by his stepfather. Becoming a delinquent in his teenage years, Speck is eventually sentenced to psychiatric counseling, which he avoids by hopping a train out of town. Speck subsequently marries a woman named Sissy, who leaves him due to his violent, demeaning mistreatment of her. After the divorce, Speck moves to Chicago, where he makes the acquaintance of a student nurse named Sharon. One night in 1966, an intoxicated Speck, needing money for a trip to New Orleans, breaks into Sharon's dormitory, intent on robbing her and her eight roommates. Speck experiences a psychotic break during the burglary, and ends up raping and torture-murdering Sharon and seven of the other women; the sole survivor, Sondra Azano, makes it through the night by hiding under a bed.

Speck spends the proceeding days drifting in and out of motels and bars in an inebriated haze, at one point confessing his crimes to a prostitute, who he then assaults. The officers who respond to the disturbance, unaware that Speck is wanted for mass murder, merely confiscate his firearm. Speck winds up in a flophouse, where he attempts suicide by slitting his wrists. Speck survives and is hospitalized. While treating Speck, a physician realizes that he is the killer that the police are looking for after spotting the "Born to Raise Hell" tattoo on Speck's arm.

Speck is placed under arrest, and identified at the hospital by Sondra. Initially given the death penalty for his crimes, Speck's sentence is reduced to 400–1200 years, to be served in the Joliet Correctional Center. Speck refuses to attend any of his parole hearings, is uncooperative in therapy, and resigns himself to spending the rest of his life behind bars, where he dies of a heart attack in 1991. Four years later, a video of Speck (who has burgeoning breasts due to smuggled female hormones that he has been taking) doing drugs and bantering with his cellmate and lover was leaked. In the footage, the strung out Speck at one point declares, "Hell, if they knew how much fun I was havin' in here, they'd let me loose!"

Cast 
 Corin Nemec as Richard Speck
 Edward Carroll as Richard Speck (age 12)
 Cherish Lee as Sharon
 Ian Patrick Williams as Harry the Bartender
 Eliza Swords as Doris
 Kelsey McCann as Annette
 Joanne Chew as Sondra Azano
 Lynna Yee as Miranda
 Alexis Adkins as Bernice
 Jeanine Del Carloas as Vivian
 Cameo Cara Martine as Barbara Billing
 Daniel Bonjour as Detective Harper
 Tony Todd as Captain Joe Dunning
 Andrew Divoff as Detective Jack Whitaker
 Arthur Bonner as Detective McGee
 Jennifer House as Sissy Speck
 Debbie Rochon as Candy
 Joe Tong as Detective Intern Dave
 Mitchell Welch as Left Eye
 Caia Coley as Nurse Boyd
 John Eric Bentley as Dr. Wilkins
 Timothy Oman as Judge Petrone
 John Burke as Prosecuting Attorney Stevens
 Daniel Tostenson as Defense Attorney Getty
 Brent Fidler as Dr. Ziphoryn
 Leonard Anderson as Tyrone

Reception 

Arrow in the Head's Ammon Gilbert, who awarded Chicago Massacre: Richard Speck a score of 2/4, praised Corin Nemec's portrayal of Speck, but was critical of every other aspect of the film, which they found suffered from "A jumbled storyline and performances that felt rushed and uninspired." Steve Barton of Dread Central gave the film a grade of 2½ out of 5, commended the "slick direction" and "solid performances" and heavily criticized the acting of Joanne Chew, who he derided as being "one of the worst actresses I've seen in recent memory."

Michael Feifer won the award for Best Producer, while the film itself won the Audience Choice Award for Best Feature, at the 2007 Beverly Hills Film Festival.

References

External links 

 
 

2007 films
2007 horror films
American horror films
Films directed by Michael Feifer
Crime films based on actual events
Films set in Chicago
Films shot in Chicago
Films set in the 1960s
Cultural depictions of rapists
Cultural depictions of American men
Cultural depictions of male criminals
2000s English-language films
2000s American films